Conrad von Bolanden (9 August 1828 – 30 May 1920), born Joseph Eduard Konrad Bischoff, was a German prelate and novelist in the Roman Catholic Diocese of Speyer, who wrote A Wedding Trip, Queen Bertha and Historical Tales of Frederick II.

Life
A German novelist, son of a rich merchant, b. 9 August 1828, at Niedergailbach, a village of the Palatinate, in that time a part of Bavaria. Now Niedergailbach belongs to the Saarland, although the main portion of the Palatinate (region) became a part of the neighbour-state Rheinland-Pfalz. Bolanden attended the Latin school at Blieskastel, the seminary at Speyer, and in 1849 entered the University of Munich to study theology.

Ordained priest in Speyer 1852 he was appointed assistant pastor at the cathedral (Speyer Cathedral). Two years later he became pastor at Kirchheimbolanden. During this time he wrote his first four works: "A Wedding Trip" (about Martin Luther), "Queen Bertha " (Bertha of Savoy), "Historical Tales of Frederick II."(Frederick II of Prussia) and "Gustav Adolf" (Gustavus Adolphus of Sweden). From the castle and village of Bolanden (between Kirchheim-Bolanden and Börrstadt) he chose his pen name "Conrad von Bolanden". In 1870 the priest resigned his parish to devote himself exclusively to literary work, and lived in strict retirement at Speyer.

He published more than 60 books, mostly novels, of which the most noteworthy are: "Canossa", "Franz von Sickingen" "Trowel or Cross", "Night of St. Bartholomew" (St. Bartholomew's Day massacre), "Savonarola", "Crusades", "Wambold", "Charlemagne", "Otto the Great" (Otto I, Holy Roman Emperor), "Pillar of Truth". His novels and romances, though not all of equal worth, are written for the people, brilliant in conception, simple in style. He fearlessly defends the Catholic standpoint and supports his position by frequent quotations from original sources.  His works were widely read and have been translated into English and other European languages. Some time his publications were prohibited in the Kingdom of Prussia. By Pope Pius IX he was honored with the title of a Papal Chamberlain (Papal Gentlemen). Bolanden was the first priest of the Diocese of Speyer, who had a driver license. In his birth-village of Niedergailbach a street was named in his honour in 1993.

Bibliography (partial list)

A Wedding Trip, 
Queen Bertha
Historical Tales of Frederick II
Canossa
Trowel or Cross
Night of St. Bartholomew
Savonarola, Crusades
Wambold, Charlemagne
Otto the Great
Pillar of Truth.

References

Meyers Konversations-Lexikon

External links
 
 
 German Wikipedia article with copious illustrations

People from the Palatinate (region)
1828 births
1920 deaths
German male writers
Papal chamberlains